Pieter Rossouw de Klerk (born 21 August 1989) is a South African rugby union player for the  in the Pro14. His regular playing position is tighthead prop.

In total he managed 33 matches for the Blue Bulls and 14 games for the Bulls.

He signed for Glasgow Warriors in 2014 and won the Pro 12 title in the season 2014-15. On 31 July 2015 Glasgow Warriors announced that De Klerk would be released from his contract due to personal reasons. On 27 September 2015, Klerk signed for top French club Grenoble in the Top 14 from the 2015–2016 season.

References

Living people
1989 births
South African rugby union players
Rugby union props
Bulls (rugby union) players
Blue Bulls players
Free State Cheetahs players
Cheetahs (rugby union) players
Griffons (rugby union) players
Glasgow Warriors players
Afrikaner people
Alumni of Paarl Gimnasium
Southern Kings players
FC Grenoble players
US Colomiers players
CS Bourgoin-Jallieu players
Rugby union players from the Western Cape